David Devine (born 20 June 2001) is a Scottish professional footballer who plays as a defender for Alloa Athletic, on loan from Motherwell.

Club career
On 18 May 2019, Devine debuted for Motherwell as a substitute in a 3–2 home win versus Livingston. On 9 July 2019, he signed a new contract keeping him at the club until 2021.

On 23 January 2020, Devine was loaned out to Dumfries club Queen of the South until 31 May 2020.

In June 2021, Devine signed a new two-contract with Motherwell. On 30 September 2021, he moved on loan to East Fife until the end of the season. However an injury with the Methil outfit meant that he was unable to play during the 2021–22 season.

Devine was loaned to Alloa Athletic on 1 September 2022.

Career statistics

References

2001 births
Living people
Scottish footballers
Association football defenders
Motherwell F.C. players
East Fife F.C. players
Queen of the South F.C. players
Scottish Professional Football League players
Alloa Athletic F.C. players